Takis Fotopoulos (born 1940) is a Greek political philosopher, economist and writer who founded the Inclusive Democracy movement, aiming at a synthesis of classical democracy with libertarian socialism and the radical currents in the new social movements. He is an academic, and has written many books and over 900 articles,. He is the editor of The International Journal of Inclusive Democracy  (which succeeded Democracy & Nature) and is the author of Towards An Inclusive Democracy (1997) in which the foundations of the Inclusive Democracy project were set. His latest book is The New World Order in Action: Volume 1: Globalization, the Brexit Revolution and the "Left"- Towards a Democratic Community of Sovereign Nations (December 2016). Fotopoulos is Greek and lives in London.

Early life
Fotopoulos was born on the Greek island of Chios and his family moved to Athens soon afterwards. After graduating from the University of Athens with degrees in Economics and Political Science and in Law, he moved to London in 1966 for postgraduate study at the London School of Economics on a Varvaressos scholarship from Athens University. He was a student syndicalist and activist in Athens and then a political activist in London, taking an active part in the 1968 student protests there, and in organisations of the revolutionary Greek Left during the struggle against the Greek military junta of 1967–1974. During this period, he was a member of the Greek group called Revolutionary Socialist Groups in London, which published the newspaper Μαμή ("Midwife", from the Marxian dictum, "violence is the midwife of revolution") for which he wrote several articles. Fotopoulos married Sia Mamareli (a former lawyer) in 1966; the couple have a son, Costas (born in 1974), who is a Composer and Pianist.

Academia and afterwards
Fotopoulos was a Senior Lecturer in Economics at the Polytechnic of North London from 1969 to 1989, until he began editing the journal Society & Nature, later Democracy & Nature and subsequently the online International Journal of Inclusive Democracy. He was also a columnist of Eleftherotypia, the second-biggest newspaper in Greece.

Inclusive Democracy

Fotopoulos developed the political project of Inclusive Democracy (ID) in 1997 (an exposition can be found in Towards An Inclusive Democracy). The first issue of Society & Nature declared that:

our ambition is to initiate an urgently needed dialogue on the crucial question of developing a new liberatory social project, at a moment in History when the Left has abandoned this traditional role.

It specified that the new project should be seen as the outcome of a synthesis of the democratic, libertarian socialist and radical Green traditions. Since then, a dialogue has followed in the pages of the journal, in which supporters of the autonomy project like Cornelius Castoriadis, social ecology supporters including its founder Murray Bookchin, and Green activists and academics like Steven Best have taken part.

The starting point for Fotopoulos' work is that the world faces a multi-dimensional crisis (economic, ecological, social, cultural and political) which is caused by the concentration of power in elites, as a result of the market economy, representative democracy and related forms of hierarchical structure. An inclusive democracy, which involves the equal distribution of power at all levels, is seen not as a utopia (in the negative sense of the word) or a "vision" but as perhaps the only way out of the present crisis, with trends towards its creation manifesting themselves today in many parts of the world. Fotopoulos is in favor of market abolitionism, although he would not identify himself as a market abolitionist as such because he considers market abolition as one aspect of an inclusive democracy which refers only to the economic democracy component of it. He maintains that "modern hierarchical society," which for him includes both the capitalist market economy and "socialist" statism, is highly oriented toward economic growth, which has glaring environmental contradictions. Fotopoulos proposes a model of economic democracy for a stateless, marketless and moneyless economy but he considers that the economic democracy component is equally significant to the other components of ID, i.e. political or direct democracy, economic democracy, ecological democracy and democracy in the social realm. Fotopoulos' work has been critically assessed by important activists, theorists and scholars.

Selected bibliography
 Towards An Inclusive Democracy. The Crisis of the Growth Economy and the Need for a New Liberatory Project (London/New York: Cassell Continuum, 1997), 401 pp.  and 0-304-33628-9.
 Education, Culture and Modernization, ed. by Peter Alheit et al. (Roskide University, 1995). (Takis Fotopoulos contribution: "The crisis of the growth economy, the withering away of the nation-state and the community-based society").
 Defending Public Schools, ed. by David A. Gabbard & E. Wayne Ross (Praeger, 2004). (Takis Fotopoulos contribution: "The State, the Market and (Mis-)education").
 Critical Perspectives on Globalisation, ed. by Robert Hunter Wade, Marina Della Giusta and Uma Kambhampati (Chelthenham, UK & Northampton, MA US: Edward Elgar publishing, 2006). (Takis Fotopoulos contribution: "The global 'war' of the transnational elite").
 Eco-socialism as Politics: Rebuilding the Basis of Our Modern Civilisation ed. by Qingzhi Huan (Springer, 1st Edition, 2010, XI), 224 p., Hardcover, . (Takis Fotopoulos contribution: "The De-growth Utopia: The Incompatibility of De-growth within an Internationalised Market Economy").
 Academic Repression: Reflections from the Academic Industrial Complex ed. by A.J.Nocella, Steven Best, Peter McLaren (AK Press, Oakland, CA & Edinburgh, 2010), 590 p, paperback, . (Takis Fotopoulos contribution: "Systemic Aspects of Academic Repression in the New World Order". A full version of this essay is published in The International Journal of Inclusive Democracy, Vol. 4,  No. 4 (October 2008).
 Critical Pedagogy in the new dark ages: challenges and possibilities, ed by Maria Nikolakaki (Peter Lang Publishing, 2012), . (Takis Fotopoulos contribution: "From (mis)education to Paedeia," pp. 81–119.)
 Karl Marx, The Communist Manifesto, ed by Frederic L. Bender (second revised edition; New York: W.W. Norton & Co, 2013), . (Takis Fotopoulos & A. Gezerlis contribution: "Hardt & Negri's Empire: A new Communist Manifesto or a reformist Welcome to Neoliberal Globalization?," (extract),  pp. 232–34.)
 [https://www.amazon.com/dp/1615772472/ref=sr_1_2?ie=UTF8&qid=1482278099&sr=8-2&keywords=new+world+order+in+action ''The New World Order in Action. Vol. 1: Globalization, the Brexit Revolution and the 'Left - Towards a Democratic Community of Sovereign Nations] (San Diego, Cal., US: Progressive Press, 2016). .

See also
 Anarchist economics

References

Further reading
Takis Fotopoulos, "Inclusive Democracy" entry in the Routledge Encyclopedia of International Political Economy (ed. by Barry Jones), Vol. 2 (2001), pp. 732–740.
“The Inclusive Democracy project – six years on“ (essays on the ID project by Michael Levin, Arran Gare, David Freeman, Serge Latouche, Jean-Claude Richard, Takis Nikolopoulos, Rafael Spósito, Guido Galafassi, Takis Fotopoulos and others), Democracy & Nature, Vol. 9, No. 3 (November 2003).
“Debate on the Inclusive Democracy project (Parts I & II)“, The International Journal of Inclusive Democracy, Vol. 1, No. 2 (January 2005) and Vol. 1, No. 3 (May 2005).
Takis Fotopoulos, "Inclusive Democracy" in Alternative Economies, Alternative Societies ed. by Oliver Ressler & Aneta Szylak, 240 pages (20 pages in color), languages: English and Polish,  (Gdansk: Wyspa Institute of Art, Poland, 2007). [Published in German/Hungarian by Promedia Verlag, Vienna 2008. .]

External linksOverviews "Inclusive Democracy" entry in the Routledge Encyclopedia of International Political Economy (ed. by Barry Jones), Vol. 2 (2001), pp. 732–740. 
Takis Fotopoulos' ArchiveSelected interviews . Takis Fotopoulos' Interview about Inclusive Democracy". Interview taken by Oliver Ressler for his video series Alternative Economics, Alternative Societies (2003-2008) (July 19, 2003). Retrieved 21 April 2014.
 Inclusive Democracy - A transcript of the video interview given by Takis Fotopoulos to Oliver Ressler for the project Alternative Economics, Alternative Societies (2003-2008) (Recorded in London, 2003). Retrieved 9 October 2015.
Interview with Galina Tichinskaya for Pravda.ru:  and transcript: "Is there a way out of the crisis within EU? The case of Greece" (26 February 2015).
 "On the rise of Neoliberalism: An Interview with Takis Fotopoulos" (8 May 2009). Retrieved 21 April 2014.
Interview for Equal Time for Freethought radio show, [original aired as Show 247: Takis Fotopoulos, 30 December 2007; later due to its poor audio quality replaced and renamed Show 289: 1-Hour Special: A Prescription for Real Social Change.] (WBAI radio 99.5 FM, New York City, USA). transcript, audio (1:00:48 min).Selected talks'''
 "Inclusive Democracy as a political project for a new libertarian synthesis: rationale, proposed social structure and transition" talk given by Takis Fotopoulos at the CNT centenary conference on self-management (Barcelona, 10 April 2010). Retrieved 21 April 2014.
 Takis Fotopoulos talk on the Multidimensional Crisis and Inclusive Democracy (Exeter College, University of Oxford, 12 November 2008). Video in 3 parts: Part 1 (talk),  part 2 (talk/discussion), part 3 (discussion). Retrieved 21 April 2014.
 A talk given by Takis Fotopoulos about the Internationalization of the Capitalist Market Economy and the project of Inclusive Democracy (University of Vermont (US),  19 April 1996), followed by a discussion with Murray Bookchin, Dan Chodorkoff and others. Video in 3 parts: Part 1, Part 2, Part 3. Retrieved 21 April 2014.

1940 births
20th-century Greek philosophers
21st-century Greek philosophers
Academics of the University of North London
Alumni of the London School of Economics
Anti-globalization writers
Greek anti-capitalists
20th-century Greek economists
Greek male writers
Greek political writers
Greek socialists
Libertarian socialists
Living people
National and Kapodistrian University of Athens alumni
Writers from Athens
Writers from Chios
Philosophers of economics
Philosophers of education
Philosophers of history
Philosophers of law
Philosophers of technology
Philosophers of war
Political philosophers
Greek social commentators
Social philosophers
Theorists on Western civilization
Writers about activism and social change
Writers about direct democracy
Male non-fiction writers